is a 3D fighting video game published by Koei and developed by Omega Force in 1998 for the PlayStation. Destrega separates itself from other games by creating a Rock, Paper, Scissors type of fighting system.

Gameplay

The fighting style in the game is unique in many aspects. Movement includes the ability to freely roam the current environment. The X button jumps, while R1 causes the player to dash and L1 blocks. The close range fighting system is like Rock, Paper, Scissors where each type of attack is stronger and weaker than another. The Square button results in a quick (but weak) attack; Triangle a slow and powerful one. Circle allows you to sidestep, allowing an attack by slipping behind your opponent.

After stepping far back, the charge bar changes from Red to Blue, indicating you can use magic attacks. Just like close range there are three attacks. The Fast (Bidu), Power (Est), and Span (Foh). bidu travels fast but hits weak, Est hits hard but travels slow, and if you are far away, the attack will disappear. Foh fires a multiple blast and does medium damage. Bidu beats Est, Est beats Foh, Foh beats Bidu. Bidu drains the least charge, Foh medium, and Est the most.

You can also combine magic attacks. Different combinations equal different results. There is a Level 1 attack; Bidu, Est, and Foh (3 Combinations). Then there is a Level 2 attack; Bidu Bidu, Bidu Est, Bidu Foh, Est Est, Est Foh, Foh Foh, etc. (9 Combinations). All of which can be reversed (EX: Foh Est) Then the Level 3 attack, Bidu Bidu Bidu, Bidu Bidu Est, Est Est Bidu, Foh, Biou Foh, etc. (21 Combinations). Then there is a Level 4 attack, Bidu Est Foh (any order), (1 Combination), which does a powerful long wide attack.

The charge bar, located in the top corner of the player's screen, has 4 colors. Red, Green, Yellow, and Blue. Red means magic cannot be used (i.e. when in close-range). When yellow, you can do a level one attack. A green charge bar indicates that any level 2 attack (an attack with two attacks strung together) can be used. Blue indicates a level 3 or 4 attack is possible.

Charged attacks are also possible. While charging (by holding Triangle, Square, or Circle) holding R1, L1, or X can do added effects. R1 does a charged run that can also deflect magic that is weaker than your current charge bar. L1 does a charge guard which blocks ALL magic until your charge bar is fully drained. You can also block level one attacks by holding L1, resulting in little damage, or press it right before contact and deflect it causing no damage. The X button does a charged jump which results in a higher jump, letting your character reach a platform that couldn't be reached by a regular jump. Or you can hit X to jump and hit Bidu, Est, Foh of any type/level and fire another different set of attacks while in the air. You can also land on your feet after being knocked into the air by tapping L1 while in the air.

Game Modes are 1P Battle (Fight CPU), Story (Fight CPUs based on the story), Versus (Fight 2P), Team Battle (Fight with up to 6 characters controlled by a human or player), Time Attack (Finish game with as little time as possible), and Endurance (Fight as many CPU people as possible. You gain health based on the speed of the battle fought).

Plot
1000 years ago, the Strega appeared in the small country of Zamuel. These Strega possessed mysterious powers, and passed their knowledge to the people of Zamuel, transforming the poor country into a prosperous nation. They bestowed upon them mystical objects, known as Jeno, which would enable ordinary humans to exercise powers to their own. However, the Strega underestimated the overwhelming drive of human ambition and greed. With this new power, the people of Zamuel would invade their neighboring lands. In no time, the entire continent transformed itself into a world of destruction and death.

Through the millennium, the continent struggled to return to the golden age of prosperity it enjoyed before the Jeno War. Then one day the objects (now called Relics) were discovered in the Empire of Ipsen. After learning that these objects could allow a person to wield great power, the Emperor ordered Lord Zauber to restore them. News of the revival reached the descendants of Strega, and they pleaded with the Emperor to suppress the Relics. The Emperor responded by declaring war on the Strega. In the ensuing battle, most of the Imperial family, a great number of the high-ranking ministers, and many Strega were killed. Almost immediately, the other lords began vying for power, but the contest was a short one. Using the power of the relics, Zauber easily crushed the opposition. Having seized control, he appointed himself Prime Minister and began eliminating anyone who posed a potential threat. Fearing that the Strega would try once again to seal off the power of the Relics, Zauber began to systematically hunt down any survivors...

Characters
Names in parenthesis are the names used in the Japanese version of the game

 Gradd (Grad): Gradd is the main character of Destrega and lives in the mountains. He enjoys a rather carefree life and makes a living searching for valuable metals - using his magic to blast rocks. However, the Strega Hunt ordered by Zauber has reached a small village and has caused great damage. To take revenge for his villagers, Gradd has risen up to face his greatest enemy: Zauber. Strega Power: Heat Blast
 Celia (Serea): Like Gradd, Celia is one of the last surviving Strega. After becoming separated from her family during the 11-year war, she was taken by a nomadic tribe in the East. She lived her life not knowing she was a Strega until she met Rohzen, who tells her of the mission she has as a Strega. Celia now accompanies Rohzen as they travel throughout Ipsen seeking other Strega. She's a sister of Fahlma. Strega Power: Wind
 Rohzen (Rozen): Rohzen was also a representative of the Strega 11 years ago when they tried to stop the Relics from coming into use again. Injured and beaten by the Imperial forces, Rohzen disappears. He now returns to gather the surviving Strega and put a stop to Zauber's ambitious plans for world conquest. He is currently traveling through Ipsen in search of other Strega survivors with Celia. Strega Power: Lightning
 Raone (Laon): Raone is Zauber's most trusted general and right-hand man. He entered into Zauber's service when Zauber was just a small landholder. He will accept any orders assigned to him, and carry them out without fail. As far as Raone is concerned, Zauber's word is law. Strega Power: Aura Blast
 Fahlma (Falma): After Zauber managed to gain control of the warring states, Fahlma joins him as a young Relic bearer. He is extremely skilled in using the Relics, and is believed to be as strong as Zauber's most trusted general, Raone. He keeps his thoughts to himself, giving no one any insight to his character. Fahlma says nothing of his past, so his background is unknown. He's also a brother of Celia. Strega Power: Light
 Tieme (Teem): As a leader of the Resistance, Tieme strives to defeat Zauber and restore his country to its former glory. Long ago, he was a knight for one of the royal families, before Zauber took control. Tieme has gathered the remaining knights who oppose Zauber and has knit them into a small fighting force. Strega Power: Sword's Aura
 Couger (Kouga): Couger is a spy sent from a small country at the edge of the continent, and had joined Tieme and the resistance. As a foreigner, he is the one character who is able to view the current situation objectively. He moves silently throughout the land, gathering information, and executing secret missions. Couger is afraid that if Zauber is not stopped soon, his country may be Zauber's next target. Strega Power: Blades
 Milena: Milena is the daughter of the former Prime Minister of Ipsen, and holds a temporary position in the Imperial Military. She spends most of her time in the Palace caring for her cousin, Princess Anjie. Milena's goal is to find the man who killed her father 11 years ago. Strega Power: Ice
 Anjie (Anzeal): Princess Anjie is the second daughter born into the Imperial family; however the rest of her family was killed during the fighting 11 years ago. As the only remaining survivor of the Imperial line, she has been in the very protective, and very strict, custody of her cousin Milena since the age of three. She often wishes she could give up her title and join the military like her cousin. Strega Power: Geometrical figures (Triangle, Circle, Square and X)
 Doyle (Doil): After seeing the horrid results of Relic fighting, Doyle resigned from the military service and vowed to give up violence. In his prime, it was rumored that he was as strong as Zauber, even though Zauber possesses the Master Relic. He now lives quietly with his own son, Reyus, in a remote area in Ipsen. Strega Power: Fire
 Reyus (Reus): Reyus is the son of Doyle. He acknowledges himself as Strega, but hides his Strega powers, as they have not awakened. Zauber, seeking to force Doyle's cooperation, kidnaps Reyus. In the confusion that follows, his Strega powers suddenly manifest. Strega Power: Water
 Zauber: Zauber who is the Prime Minister of Ipsen, plots to take over the whole Empire. He is responsible for restoring the power of the Relics, which in turn, has been used to crush his political opposition. Now, he turns his attention to the task of hunting down the Strega. Zauber possesses the Master Relic - the key to all Relic power. Strega Power: Darkness

Reception

The game received "average" reviews according to the review aggregation website GameRankings. In Japan, Famitsu gave it a score of 29 out of 40.

References

External links
 

1998 video games
Koei games
Multiplayer and single-player video games
PlayStation (console) games
PlayStation Network games
Fighting games
Video games developed in Japan
Omega Force games